The Gallant Fool is a 1926 American silent romantic drama film directed by Duke Worne and starring Billy Sullivan, Hazel Deane and Ruth Royce. The film is set in a Ruritanian Kingdom named Valdonia, where a young American arrives to collect a debt towards his millionaire father but ends up impersonating a prince.

Cast
 Billy Sullivan as Billy Banner 
 Hazel Deane as Princess Iris 
 Ruth Royce as Cynthia 
 Frank Baker as Count Danvo 
 Jimmy Aubrey as Beaney Mulligan 
 Ferdinand Schumann-Heink as Crown Prince Boris 
 Robert Walker as Captain Turgemore

References

Bibliography
 Munden, Kenneth White. The American Film Institute Catalog of Motion Pictures Produced in the United States, Part 1. University of California Press, 1997.

External links

1926 films
1926 romantic drama films
American romantic drama films
Films directed by Duke Worne
American silent feature films
1920s English-language films
Rayart Pictures films
American black-and-white films
1920s American films
Silent romantic drama films
Silent American drama films
English-language romantic drama films